187 (one hundred [and] eighty-seven) is the natural number following 186 and preceding 188.

In mathematics
There are 187 ways of forming a sum of positive integers that adds to 11, counting two sums as equivalent when they are cyclic permutations of each other. There are also 187 unordered triples of 5-bit binary numbers whose bitwise exclusive or is zero.

Per Miller's rules, the triakis tetrahedron produces 187 distinct stellations. It is the smallest Catalan solid, dual to the truncated tetrahedron, which only has 9 distinct stellations.

In other fields
There are 187 chapters in the Hebrew Torah.

See also
 187 (disambiguation)

References

Integers